The 1995 PGA Championship was the 77th PGA Championship, held August 10–13 at Riviera Country Club in Los Angeles, California. Steve Elkington shot a final round 64 (−7) and won his only major championship in a sudden-death playoff. Elkington sank a  birdie putt on the first playoff hole (par 4, 18th) to defeat Colin Montgomerie. Ernie Els, the third round leader, shot 72 (+1) and finished two strokes back, in a tie for third with Jeff Maggert. His 197 after 54 holes was the lowest-ever for a major championship.

A new 72-hole scoring record for the PGA Championship was set at 267, the second straight year for a new low.  Bobby Nichols' 271 in 1964 stood for thirty years, until Nick Price had 269 in 1994. The record was lowered by two strokes in 2001.

Elkington became the fourth Australian-born player to win the PGA Championship, preceded by Jim Ferrier in 1947, David Graham in 1979, and Wayne Grady in 1990. The next was Jason Day in 2015.

Brad Faxon shot a final round 63 to climb to fifth place and earned a spot on the Ryder Cup team. His record was 1–2–0 in his first Ryder Cup, as the U.S. team narrowly lost at home.

This was the third major championship at Riviera, which previously hosted the U.S. Open in 1948 and the PGA Championship in 1983. It was the fourth PGA Championship in California (1929, 1977, 1983), and the last until 2020.

Round summaries

First round
Thursday, August 10, 1995

Second round
Friday, August 11, 1995

Third round
Saturday, August 12, 1995

Final round
Sunday, August 13, 1995

Source:

Playoff
The sudden-death playoff began on the par-4 18th hole, where both drove into the fairway and reached the green in regulation. Montgomerie was slightly closer, but missed his putt to extend the playoff.

References

External links
Yahoo! Sports: 1995 PGA Championship leaderboard
PGA.com – 1995 PGA Championship

PGA Championship
Golf in Los Angeles
PGA Championship
PGA Championship
PGA Championship
PGA Championship